Antibodies is a 2005 German crime thriller film directed by Christian Alvart and starring Wotan Wilke Möhring, André Hennicke and Heinz Hoenig. It was released in Germany on 7 July 2005.

Plot 
In Berlin, the pederast serial killer Gabriel Engel, who later admitted to brutally killing 13 boys and painted impressive religious works of art with their blood, is accidentally taken during an overnight operation. Commissioner Seiler is charged with the interrogation of the murderer.

In the small village of Herzbach, memories of the unsolved murder of 12-year-old Lucy are still alive and the crime is attributed to Engel. Michael Martens, a police officer from Herzbach, decides to travel to Berlin to talk with Engel. During the case, he neglected his wife and children.

In Berlin, it is assumed that there are parallels between the murders. The Berlin police are no longer able to get information from Engel. Martens tries his luck, and manages to persuade Engel to talk. However, Engel is playing a game with Martens during which reality and fiction blend more and more. Martens is soon convinced that the murderer of the girl is still at large.

Martens, a devout Catholic, slowly begins to explore his dark side and begins a brief affair with a woman from the city.

After Engel has ingested poison which he acquired through bribery, he has 48 hours to live. Finally, Engel tells Martens the story of the murder of Lucy, which he claims to have not committed, but only observed. He tries to throw suspicion on Martens' difficult 13-year-old son.

The desperate Martens then decides to kill his son, but in the meantime, Commissioner Seiler finds out that Engel has committed suicide and that Martens has been tricked by Engel as a means to kill beyond the grave. Luckily, Seiler is able to find Marten before he goes through with it and saves him and his son.

Cast

References

External links 
 
 

2005 films
2005 crime thriller films
2005 independent films
2005 psychological thriller films
2000s serial killer films
Films directed by Christian Alvart
Films set in Berlin
German crime thriller films
German independent films
2000s German-language films
German psychological thriller films
German serial killer films
2000s German films